Roger Dale Phegley (born October 16, 1956) is an American retired professional basketball player. A 6'6" (198 cm) 205 lb (93 kg) shooting guard, he played college basketball at Bradley University and had a career in the NBA from 1978 to 1984. He ended his career playing in France.

High school and college career
Phegley was both a basketball and baseball standout at East Peoria High School. As a pitcher, he played a significant role in East Peoria's making the state baseball tournament for the first time. He even played briefly as a pitcher at Bradley University. During his college basketball career Phegley was named an All-American by Converse in 1978 and a third-team choice by the Associated Press and United Press International. He was Missouri Valley Conference Player of the Year in 1977, and was an all-Missouri Valley Conference selection in 1977 and 1978.

NBA career and beyond
He was selected by the Washington Bullets with the 14th overall pick in the 1978 NBA draft. He averaged 8.7 points per game over his NBA career with the Washington Bullets, New Jersey Nets, Cleveland Cavaliers, San Antonio Spurs and Dallas Mavericks.

He is now living in Morton, Illinois, where he works as an insurance agent with offices in Peoria.

Notes

External links
NBA stats @ basketballreference.com

1956 births
Living people
All-American college men's basketball players
American expatriate basketball people in France
American men's basketball players
Baseball players from Illinois
Basketball players from Illinois
Bradley Braves baseball players
Bradley Braves men's basketball players
Businesspeople from Illinois
Cleveland Cavaliers players
Dallas Mavericks players
New Jersey Nets players
Olympique Antibes basketball players
People from East Peoria, Illinois
People from Morton, Illinois
San Antonio Spurs players
Shooting guards
Washington Bullets draft picks
Washington Bullets players